Merkland Street station was one of the 15 subway stations in Glasgow, Scotland. It is the only station on the system that has closed permanently. The station opened in 1896. It closed permanently in 1977 when the rest of the network was closed for modernisation. The modernisation had been announced  in 1974 by the subway's then operators, the Greater Glasgow Passenger Transport Executive (GGPTE). Although converted to electric traction in 1935 the systems infrastructure and rolling stock was virtually unchanged from its opening in 1896, and improvement to the subway was seen by the GGPTE as an essential part of plans to eliminate transport bottlenecks in the city. As part of the process, which began in 1977, all 15 stations were to be rebuilt. However it was planned to link the subway to the national rail network's newly reopened Argyle Line at Partick via an interchange station. This meant permanently closing Merkland Street and opening a new station a short distance away.

Thus, when the network reopened in 1980, it was replaced by a new station nearby named Partick, offering direct transfers to the rail station of the same name. There is evidence of Merkland Street station's existence due to a long straight and humped stretch on the underground with large diameter tunnels, although the platforms and station buildings no longer remain.

On 18 September 1940, during World War II, a German bomb, which dropped during a night raid on Glasgow and may have been intended for nearby naval facilities, landed on a bowling green to the south of the station. The explosion this caused resulted in damage to both tunnels and closure of this part of the system until repairs were completed in January 1941.

Merkland Street is one of the stations mentioned in Cliff Hanley's song The Glasgow Underground.

References

Notes

Sources 
 
 
 
 Merkland Street station on navigable OS map
 SubBrit article on the Merkland Street

Glasgow Subway stations
Disused railway stations in Glasgow
Railway stations in Great Britain opened in 1896
Railway stations in Great Britain closed in 1977
1977 disestablishments in Scotland
Partick